Scoil Mhuire is Irish for "Mary's school". It is a common name for schools named for Mary, mother of Jesus and may refer to:

Schools in Ireland
 Scoil Mhuire, Buncrana
 Scoil Mhuire, Clane
 Scoil Mhuire, Cork
 Scoil Mhuire, Longford

Other uses
 An old name for the village of Schull, County Cork, Ireland

See also
 Scoil Mhuire CBS, Mullingar, former name of Saint Mary's Primary School in Mullingar, County Westmeath, Ireland
 St Mary's Grammar School (Scoil Mhuire Machaire Fiolta), Magherafelt, County Londonderry, Northern Ireland
 St. Mary's School (disambiguation)
 Colaiste Mhuire (disambiguation) (Mary's College)
 Mhuire (disambiguation)